Welcome to: Our House (stylized as welcome to: OUR HOUSE) is the second and final studio album by hip hop supergroup Slaughterhouse, consisting of Crooked I, Joe Budden, Joell Ortiz and Royce da 5'9". The album was released on August 28, 2012 via Shady Records and Interscope Records. This would also be their only major label album before disbanding on April 26, 2018.

Background
On February 9, 2012, Crooked I, in an interview with XXL, said that Eminem has been confirmed to feature on the album and provide most of the production, and Royce later stated that Eminem would mix the album. Alex da Kid, The Alchemist, J.U.S.T.I.C.E. League and No I.D. later were confirmed to produce on the album. The title of the album was announced in January 2012, before a tour that began on March 8 in Dallas and concluded May 10 in Nashville was also confirmed. Joe Budden has publicly said the group was abusing substances while recording the album.

Delay and mixtape 
On June 4, on 106 & Park, Royce Da 5'9 stated that the album has been pushed back till July 2012, instead of June 12. Further delays led to a release date of August 28, 2012. On July 7, 2012, Royce announced in an interview with Jenny Boom Boom that the group will release a pre-album mixtape around the first week of August. Joe Budden revealed via Twitter that the mixtape is called On the House and will be hosted by DJ Drama.  Royce Da 5'9" released the cover art for the mixtape through Twitter on August 7, 2012. A promotional video for the mixtape was released on August 6, 2012, and previewed a song called "See Dead People" with confirmed guest appearances by Eminem. Rapper Sauce Tha Boss, signed to Crooked I's COB label, claimed via Twitter that the mixtape will drop on Friday, August 10, 2012. This was not the case, however, the mixtape was released via DatPiff and DJ Drama on August 19, 2012.

Singles 
On February 27, 2012 Funkmaster Flex premiered "Hammer Dance", the lead single from the album, on New York's Hot 97 radio station. The song was produced by AraabMuzik. On March 13, the song was released through iTunes. On April 25, the group premiered "My Life", the second single from the album, which features Cee Lo Green and is produced by Streetrunner and Sarom. The song was released on iTunes on May 15, 2012. On June 29, the third single, "Throw It Away", was released, also on Hot 97, with Funkmaster Flex. The song features vocals from the American rapper Swizz Beatz and production from Mr. Porter. The single was later available to purchase on iTunes, on July 2, 2012. A video for the single was released on August 31, 2012. The group confirmed in an interview on BET Awards 2012 with Hip Hop Wired that the fourth single will be "Goodbye", produced by Boi-1da. "Goodbye" premiered on Shade 45 on August 9, 2012, during an interview with the group and Eminem. On August 14, the single was released on iTunes for digital download. On August 21, 2012 the fifth single, Throw That which features their executive producer Eminem, was released for digital download on iTunes.

Guest appearances 
On August 4, 2012, the track listing was confirmed with the guests appearances. Notably, Shady records label head Eminem appears on three tracks. Joining Mr. Mathers are Cee Lo Green, Busta Rhymes, Skylar Grey, Swizz Beatz and B.o.B. The producers on the album are AraabMuzik, Streetrunner, Sarom, Mr. Porter, Boi-1da, The Alchemist, J.U.S.T.I.C.E. League, No I.D., Alex da Kid, Hit-Boy, T-Minus, Black Key, Zukhan, Kane Beatz, and Eminem as the executive producer.

Reception

Commercial performance
Welcome to: Our House was Slaughterhouse's most successful release to date, peaking at number two in the Billboard 200 and at Number One in the Billboard Top Rap Albums, selling 52,000 copies in the first week. As of September 30, 2012, it has sold 80,000 copies in the US. As of January 2016, the album has sold 200,000 copies in the United States.

Critical response

Welcome to: Our House received generally positive reviews from contemporary music critics. At Metacritic, which assigns a normalized rating out of 100 to reviews from mainstream critics, the album received an average score of 70, which indicates "generally favorable reviews", based on 10 reviews. HipHopDX's editor Slava Kuperstein reviewed the album, and gave it 4.5 out of 5. Kuperstein says: "With welcome to: OUR HOUSE, Slaughterhouse has somehow managed to improve upon its already-absurd skill set." RapReviews review was written by Steve Juon, who said: "The debut was unexpectedly good and remains a classic. The official sequel to it was EXPECTED to be good and it is." In a mixed review, written by Jody RosenThe from the magazine Rolling Stone, was said "the group's second LP is a showcase for gritty traditionalism". The review had the lowest score. Allmusic's editor David Jeffries has criticized the album saying: "Crotch-grabbing tracks might crash into a convincing emo-rap number and these proven wordsmiths might have left more room for guests and hooks than they probably should have, but just because their indie debut was a more cohesive showcase doesn't mean the joy and pain of Welcome to Our House isn't worth the required sorting."

On September 5, 2012, Mark Bozzer from Canadian music magazine Exclaim! made a positive review of the album, saying "Joe, Joell, Crooked I and Royce trade quality rhymes over a varied catalogue of original productions that allow the four-piece ample room to spit their different brands of venom." The magazine XXL reviewed the album with their editor Adam Fleischer. Fleischer said: "There's rarely a weak bar on welcome to: OUR HOUSE, though the verbal dexterity isn't quite as stunning as it was on their debut." Music magazine Spin reviewed the album on September 5, 2012, and their editor Phillip Mlynar commented about album: "Despite this abundance of raps about the unadulterated greatness of rapping, the Slaughterhouse four pull it off with extraordinary sincerity, and Our House avoids devolving into some tired treatise about how these guys make "real hip-hop" and other rappers don't." Nathan S. from the website DJ Booth reviewed the album, saying: "At 16 tracks, 20 on the deluxe version, this album manages to work in more than a couple joints featuring some of the vicious rap hardcore fans were hoping for."

Track listing 

Notes
 signifies an additional producer.
 signifies a co-producer.

 Sample credits
 "Hammer Dance" samples "Falling Away from Me" performed by Korn.
 "Get Up" samples "Ali In the Jungle" performed by The Hours.
 "My Life" samples "The Rhythm of the Night" performed by Corona.
 "Flip a Bird" samples "Little Bird" performed by Imogen Heap.
 "Throw It Away" samples "UFO" performed by ESG.
 "Park It Sideways" samples "Real Love" performed by Delorean.
 "Walk of Shame" samples "Light of the Morning" performed by Band of Skulls.

Personnel
Credits for Welcome to: Our House adapted from Allmusic.

 M. Aiello - Composer
 AraabMuzik - Producer
 Reginald "Fieldy" Arvizu - Composer
 Black Key Beats - Producer
 Boi-1da - Producer
 T-Minus - Producer
 F. Bontempi - Composer
 Cullen Brooks - Assistant Engineer
 Matthew Burnett - Additional Production, Composer
 Busta Rhymes - Featured Artist
 Tony Campana - Engineer
 J. Coleman - Composer
 Jonathan Davis - Composer
 James "Munky" Shaffer - Composer
 Mickey Davis - Engineer
 Denaun - Vocals, Producer
 Dennis Dennehy - Marketing, Publicity
 Raymond "Sarom" Diaz - Producer
 DJ Mormile - A&R
 Eminem - Additional Production, Executive Producer, Featured Artist, Mixing, Producer
 Keith Ferguson - Guitar
 John Fisher - Studio Manager
 Ashanti "The Mad Violinist" Floyd - Producer
 Brian "Big Bass" Gardner - Mastering
 P. Glenister - Composer
 Alicia Graham - A&R
 A. Grant - Composer
 B.o.B - Featured Artist
 Cee-Lo Green - Featured Artist
 Skylar Grey - Featured Artist, Composer
 Chad Griffith - Photography
 Hit-Boy - Producer
 Stephanie Hsu - Creative Art
 Tony "56" Jackson - Keyboards
 J-MIKE - Producer
 Joe Strange - Assistant Engineer, Engineer
 D. Johnson - Composer
 Selena Jordan - Vocals
 Sly Jordan - Composer, Vocals
 Kane Beatz - Producer

 Alex Da Kid - Mixing, Producer
 Marc Labelle - Project Coordinator
 Edgar Luna - Engineer
 M. Gaffey - Composer
 Deborah Mannis-Gardner - Sample Clearance
 Graham Marsh - Engineer
 Marvwon - Rap
 Justine Massa - Creative Coordinator
 Maven Boys - Producer
 Alex Merzin - Engineer
 R. Montgomery - Composer
 Riggs Morales - A&R
 No I.D. - Producer
 J. Ortiz - Composer
 Dart Parker - A&R
 Luis Resto - Keyboards
 M. Samuels - Composer
 Jason Sangerman - Marketing
 Mike Saputo - Art Direction, Design
 R. Scroggins - Composer
 Les Scurry - Production Coordination
 Feras "Ferrari" Sheika - Engineer
 David Silveria - Composer
 M. Slattery - Composer
 Manny Smith - A&R
 T. Smith - Composer
 G. Spagna - Composer
 Miguel Starcevich - Back Cover Photo
 Mike Strange - Engineer, Keyboards, Mixing
 N. "Streetrunner" Warwar - Composer, Producer
 Swizz Beatz - Featured Artist
 Brian "Head" Welch - Composer
 Ryan West - Mixing
 D. Wickliffe - Composer

Charts

Weekly charts

Year-end charts

Release history

References

2012 albums
Albums produced by Alex da Kid
Albums produced by AraabMuzik
Albums produced by Boi-1da
Albums produced by Mr. Porter
Albums produced by Eminem
Albums produced by Hit-Boy
Albums produced by J.U.S.T.I.C.E. League
Albums produced by No I.D.
Albums produced by T-Minus (record producer)
Interscope Records albums
Shady Records albums
Slaughterhouse (group) albums